Cobatoxin is a toxin present in the venom of the scorpion Centruroides noxius.  It blocks two potassium channel subtypes; voltage-gated and calcium-activated channels.

Etymology
Coba is a region in Mexico where the Centruroides noxius scorpion is found.

Sources
Cobatoxin 1 and 2 are both found in the venom of the Centruroides noxius scorpion.

Chemistry

Structure
Cobatoxin is a 32-residue toxin (sequence AVCVYRTCDKDCKRRGYRSGKCINNACKCYPY-NH2) with 3 disulfide bridges, which are located on C1-C4, C2-C5 and C3- C6 (Cys3-Cys22, Cys8-Cys27, and Cys12-Cys29). The peptide backbone is folded according to an α/β scaffold, both α-helical and  two-stranded β-sheet structures are present. Cobatoxin 1 has a rod-like shape due to an extended N-terminus.

Family
Cobatoxin 1 and 2 both belong to the α-KTx family. The α-KTx family is part of the K+-channel-specific scorpion toxins (KTx), which consists of 3 families; α, β, and γ. These 3 families differ in structure.

Target
Cobatoxin 1 and 2 both block the Kv1.1 K+-channels in mice and the Shaker B K+ channels in insects, which are voltage-dependent K+-channels (Selisko, 1998).
Other voltage-dependent K+-channels that are blocked by Cobatoxin 1 are the Kv1.2 K+-channels in rats and Kv1.3 K+-channels in mice. Cobatoxin 1 also blocks the IKCa1 Ca2+-activated K+-channel.

Mode of action
Cobatoxin 1 is a pore-blocking toxin. The interaction between cobatoxin 1 and the Kv1.2 channel is first esthablished by four salt bridges, which are formed between side chains of the four Kv1.2 α-subunits and amino acids residues of cobatoxin 1. This way a stable complex is formed, named the toxin-ring. Next, a tighter interaction is formed by a hydrophobic interaction between cobatoxin 1 and the α-subunit. Then the Lys21 side chain of cobatoxin 1 blocks the pore by entering the P-domain of the ion channel, which is the selectivity filter.

Toxicity
The  of cobatoxin 1 after intracerebroventricular injection in mice is 500±45 ng.

References

Ion channel toxins